"Stay" is the debut single by hip-hop group, 2-4 Family. It is their only song in which former band member Jo O'Meara sings, because she soon leaves the band, joining S Club in 1999. Jo O'Meara takes the lead vocals, singing dramatically. It charted at #8 on the Viva Top 100. The video was added to YouTube on November 5, 2006. It has had 81,707 views as of June 17, 2009. It is 2-4 Family's most successful song ever released.

After the single, a Christmas version of Stay was also released.

1998 debut singles
1998 songs